Ibrahim Nasser Kala (Arabic:إبراهيم ناصر كلا; born 26 January 1997) is a Qatari footballer. He currently plays as a right back or winger for Al-Arabi.

Career
Kala started his career at Al-Arabi and is a product of the Al-Arabi's youth system. On 16 September 2017, Ibrahim Nasser made his professional debut for Al-Arabi against Al-Sailiya in the Pro League, replacing Ahmad Khalfan.

References

External links

1997 births
Living people
Qatari footballers
Al-Arabi SC (Qatar) players
Qatar Stars League players
Association football fullbacks
Association football wingers
Place of birth missing (living people)